Glen Eira Town Hall, known originally as Caulfield Town Hall, is located in Caulfield, Victoria, Australia.  The hall was finished in 1890 and is a designated historic building with the Heritage Council of Victoria.

References

Further reading
Murray, Peter R. and Wells, John C., "From sand, swamp and heath . . . A History of Caulfield", City of Caulfield,1980.
Solomon, Geulah, "Caulfield's Heritage"(4 vols.), City of Caulfield, 1989.

Town halls in Melbourne
Neoclassical architecture in Australia
Victorian architecture in Victoria (Australia)
1890 establishments in Australia
Government buildings completed in 1890
Buildings and structures in the City of Glen Eira
Clock towers in Australia